C. officinalis may refer to:
 Calendula officinalis, a garden plant species
 Cinchona officinalis, a tree species native to the Amazon Rainforest
 Cochlearia officinalis, a flowering plant species
 Corallina officinalis, a calcareous red seaweed species
 Cyathula officinalis, a plant species native to the China

See also
 Officinalis